This is a list of cemeteries in Alaska.

 

Cemeteries
 
Cemeteries
Alaska